Lithuania is a Northern country on the south-eastern shore of the Baltic Sea, a member of the United Nations Organisation, the Organisation for Security and Cooperation in Europe, the European Union, the North Atlantic Treaty Organisation, the World Trade Organisation. Currently, Lithuania maintains diplomatic relations with 186 states Lithuania became a member of the United Nations on 18 September 1991, and is a signatory to a number of its organizations and other international agreements. It is also a member of the Organization for Security and Cooperation in Europe, NATO and its adjunct North Atlantic Coordinating Council, the Council of Europe, and the European Union. Lithuania gained membership in the World Trade Organization on 31 May 2001.

Lithuania's membership in the EU

On 1 May 2004, Lithuania became one of the 27 member states of the European Union. The EU activities affect different spheres of politics, from consumer rights to national defence matters. In the second half of 2013, Lithuania took presidency over the EU Council. Membership in the Union has strengthened the domestic economy, giving it access to the wide pan-European market. Foreign direct investments in Lithuania are growing. The country is poised to become energy-independent. The accession to the Schengen space in 2007 has opened up possibilities for the free movement of both citizens and goods across 25 European states. Lithuania's citizens enjoy equal social guarantees while working, travelling, or studying at the Community's countries. The country now benefits from additional EU fund and programme funding in the field of education and science. As an EU citizen, every citizen of Lithuania has the guarantee of consular assistance of EU representative offices in countries where Lithuania has none.

Lithuania's membership in NATO

On 29 March 2004, Lithuania became a member of the North Atlantic Treaty Organisation It is a defensive union based on political and military cooperation of sovereign states. Its members are committed to protecting freedom, guarding shared heritage and civilisation under the principles of democracy, individual freedom, and superiority of law. According to Article 5 of the agreement, all NATO states are obliged to defend one another. Lithuania entered into cooperation with NATO in 1991. Five years later, Lithuania launched its mission to the organisation, and in late 2002, Lithuania and six other states was invited to start negotiations over membership in the Alliance. Today Lithuania sees NATO as the key and most effective collective defence system, one that ensures the security of the state and stands to defer potential aggression, and employs every measure available to strengthen trans-Atlantic relations to contribute to the strengthening of the EU-U.S. relations.

Lithuania as a part of the Northern Europe region
Lithuania is also an active member in the cooperation between Northern Europe countries. Lithuania is a member of the interparliamentary Baltic Assembly, the intergovernmental Baltic Council of Ministers and the Council of the Baltic Sea States.

Lithuania also cooperates with Nordic and other two Baltic countries through NB8 cooperation format. The similar format, called NB6 unites Nordic and Baltic countries members of EU. The main goal of NB6 cooperation is to discuss and agree on positions before presenting them in the Council of the European Union and the meetings of the EU Foreign Affairs Ministers.

The Council of the Baltic Sea States (CBSS) was established in 1992 in Copenhagen as an informal regional political forum, which main aim is to promote integration process and to affiliate close contacts between the countries of the region. The members of CBSS are Denmark, Estonia, Finland, Germany, Iceland, Latvia, Lithuania, Norway, Poland, Russia, Sweden and European Commission. The observer states are Belarus, France, Italy, Netherlands, Romania, Slovakia, Spain, United States, United Kingdom, Ukraine.

The cooperation between the Nordic Council of Ministers and Lithuania is a political cooperation through which experience exchange contributes to realization of joint goals. One of its most important functions is to discover new trends and new possibilities for joint cooperation. The information office aims to represent Nordic concepts and demonstrate Nordic cooperation in Lithuania.

Lithuania, together with other two Baltic countries, is also a member of Nordic Investment Bank (NIB) and cooperates in NORDPLUS programme committed to education.

Baltic Development Forum (BDF) is an independent nonprofit organization which unites large companies, cities, business associations and institutions in the Baltic Sea region. In 2010 the 12th Summit of the BDF was held in Vilnius.

Diplomatic relations 
As of 2022, Lithuania maintains diplomatic relations with 186 UN member states, Holy See, Kosovo and the Sovereign Military Order of Malta.

Africa

America

Asia

Europe

Oceania

Issues

Illicit drug trafficking

Lithuania has been a trans-shipment point for opiates and other illicit drugs from Russia, Southwest Asia, Latin America, and Western Europe to Eastern Europe and Scandinavia.

Anti-terrorism
Lithuania is a signatory to 8 of the 12 International Conventions related to counter-
terrorist activities

Human trafficking
The International Organization for Migration (IOM) reports that about 1,000 citizens of Lithuania fall victim to trafficking annually. Most are women between the ages of 21 and 30 who are sold into prostitution

See also
 List of diplomatic missions in Lithuania
 List of diplomatic missions of Lithuania
 List of ambassadors to Lithuania

Further reading

 Tomas Janeliūnas. 2020. Foreign Policy Analysis of a Baltic State: Lithuania and 'Grybauskaitė Doctrine'. Routledge.

References